Leonardo Puglisi (born 12 November 2007) is an Australian journalist. He is the founder of online news outlet 6 News Australia. He lives in the state of Victoria.

Career
Puglisi began his media career in 2019, founding what was then initially known as HMV Local News but rebranded in 2020 as 6 News Australia. Puglisi came to attention in 2020 when he covered the secretive demolition of a bell tower at Hawthorn West Primary School in Hawthorn, Victoria.

He has been the subject of a number of conspiracy theories, including that he was a "front" for the Morrison government and funded by Rupert Murdoch.

Despite making many jokes about not voting for Labor at the previous federal election due to his age, Puglisi has no known political affiliations.

Notable interviews
 Scott Morrison - Prime Minister of Australia (2018–2022)
 Anthony Albanese - Then-Opposition Leader and later Prime Minister (2022-)
 Kevin Rudd - Former Prime Minister of Australia (2007 - 2010, 2013)
 Bob Katter - Member of the Australian House of Representatives for Kennedy

References

Australian television journalists
2007 births
Living people